George C. Christie (born March 3, 1934) is the James B. Duke Emeritus Professor of Law at Duke University School of Law in Durham, North Carolina, where he taught jurisprudence and tort law before retiring from teaching in 2013.

Early life and education 
Christie was born in New York City in 1934. His father, himself a lawyer, emigrated from Greece to the United States in 1920. He was awarded his A.B. in 1955 and his J.D. in 1957, both from Columbia University. While at Columbia he was editor-in-chief of the Columbia Law Review. In 1962 he was granted a Diploma in International Law from Cambridge University. Later, in 1966 he received S.J.D. from Harvard University.

Career 
Christie was admitted to the bar in New York in 1957 and in the District of Columbia in 1958. He spent two years in private practice in Washington D.C. and from 1960-1961 he was a Ford Fellow at Harvard Law School. From 1961-1962 he was a Fulbright Scholar at Cambridge University. Following his time at Cambridge he became a member of the faculty at University of Minnesota Law School. In 1966 he left the University of Minnesota and returned to Washington D.C. where he served as the Assistant General Counsel for the Near East and South Asia of the Agency for International Development.

He has been on the faculty of Duke University School of Law since 1967.

He received an Honorary Doctorate from the University of Athens in 2007.

Christie influenced the Duke University academic governance through the so-called Christie Rule, recommended by a committee he was chairing in 1972. The rule aims to guarantee that the voice of the faculty be heard prior to the Board of Trustees reaching significant decisions.

Selected works

Books 
 Philosopher Kings? The Adjudication of Conflicting Human Rights and Social Values, Oxford University Press 2011, 
 The Notion of an Ideal Audience in Legal Argument, Kluwer Academic 2000, translated in French with introduction by Guy Haarscher as L'auditoire universel dans l'argumentation juridique, Bruylant 2005, 
 Law, Norms and Authority, Duckworth 1982,

Case Books 
 Advanced Torts: Cases and Materials, West Academic Publishing 2004, 3d ed. 2018 (with Joseph Sanders), 
 Cases and Materials on the Law of Torts, West Academic Publishing 1983, 5th ed. 2012 (with James E. Meeks & Jonathan Cardi), 
 Jurisprudence: Text and Readings on the Philosophy of Law, West Academic Publishing 1973, 3d ed. 2008 (with Patrick H. Martin),

References

External links 
 Duke University Law School personal page
 Articles available in the Duke Law Scholarship Repository
 Author page on SSRN

1934 births
Living people
American legal scholars
Philosophers of law
Harvard Law School alumni
Columbia Law School alumni
Duke University School of Law faculty
American people of Greek descent